Bectumomab (marketed under the trade name LymphoScan) is a mouse monoclonal antibody labelled with the radioactive isotope technetium-99m. It is used to detect non-Hodgkin's lymphoma.

References 

Monoclonal antibodies for tumors
Technetium compounds
Technetium-99m